Pheidole noda is a species of ant in the subfamily Myrmicinae. It is found in Indonesia, Bangladesh, India, Taiwan, Thailand, Vietnam, Sri Lanka, Japan and South Korea.

References

External links

 at antwiki.org
Animaldiversity.org
Itis.org

noda
Hymenoptera of Asia
Insects described in 1874